Alaska occupies the northwestern portion of the North American continent and is bordered only by Canada on the east. It is one of two U.S. states not bordered by another state; Hawaii is the other. Alaska has more ocean coastline than all of the other U.S. states combined.  About  of Canadian territory separate Alaska from Washington state. Alaska is thus an exclave of the United States that is part of the continental U.S. and the U.S. West Coast, but is not part of the contiguous U.S. Alaska is also the only state, other than Hawaii, whose capital city is accessible only via ship or air, because no roads connect Juneau to the rest of the continent.

The state is bordered by Yukon and British Columbia, Canada to the east, the Gulf of Alaska and the Pacific Ocean to the south, Russia (Chukotka Autonomous Okrug), Bering Sea, the Bering Strait, and Chukchi Sea to the west, and the Beaufort Sea and the Arctic Ocean to the north.
  Because it extends into the Eastern Hemisphere, it is technically both the westernmost and easternmost state in the United States, as well as also being the northernmost.
If the state's westernmost point were superimposed on San Francisco, California, its easternmost point would be in Jacksonville, Florida. Alaska is larger than all but 18 sovereign nations (it is slightly larger than Iran but slightly smaller than Libya). Marshlands and wetland permafrost cover  (mostly in northern, western and southwest flatlands). The Bering Glacier complex near the southeastern border with Yukon, Canada, covers  alone.

Regions
South Central Alaska is the southern coastal region and contains most of the state's population. Anchorage and many growing towns, such as Palmer, and Wasilla, lie within this area. Petroleum industrial plants, transportation, tourism, and two military bases form the core of the economy here.
The Alaska Panhandle, also known as Southeast Alaska, is home to many of Alaska's larger towns including the state capital Juneau, tidewater glaciers and extensive forests. Tourism, fishing, forestry and state government anchor the economy.
Southwest Alaska is largely coastal, bordered by both the Pacific Ocean and the Bering Sea. It is sparsely populated, and unconnected to the road system, but incredibly important to the fishing industry. Half of all fish caught in the western U.S. come from the Bering Sea, and Bristol Bay has the world's largest sockeye salmon fishery. Southwest Alaska includes Katmai and Lake Clark national parks as well as numerous wildlife refuges. The region comprises western Cook Inlet, Bristol Bay and its watersheds, the Alaska Peninsula and the Aleutian Islands. It is known for wet and stormy weather, tundra landscapes, and large populations of salmon, brown bears, caribou, birds, and marine mammals.
The Alaska Interior is home to Fairbanks. The geography is marked by large braided rivers, such as the Yukon River and the Kuskokwim River, as well as Arctic tundra lands and shorelines.
The Alaskan Bush is the remote, less crowded part of the state, encompassing 380 native villages and small towns such as Nome, Bethel, Kotzebue and, most famously, Utqiaġvik, the northernmost town in the United States.

The northeast corner of Alaska is covered by the Arctic National Wildlife Refuge. The Arctic is Alaska's most remote wilderness.

With its numerous islands, Alaska has nearly 34,000 miles (55,000 km) of tidal shoreline. The island chain extending west from the southern tip of the Alaska Peninsula is called the Aleutian Islands. Many active volcanoes are found in the Aleutians. The chain of volcanoes extends to Mount Spurr, west of Anchorage on the mainland.

One of North America's largest tides occurs in Turnagain Arm just south of Anchorage. (Many sources say Turnagain has the second-greatest tides in North America, but it has since been shown that several areas in Canada have larger tides, according to an Anchorage Daily News article dated 6/23/03.)

The Aleutian Islands cross longitude 180°, so Alaska can be considered the easternmost state as well as the westernmost. Alaska and, especially, the Aleutians are one of the extreme points of the United States. The International Date Line jogs west of 180° to keep the whole state, and thus the entire continental United States, within the same legal day.

Climate

The climate in south and southeastern Alaska is a mid-latitude oceanic climate (Köppen climate classification: Cfb), and a subarctic oceanic climate (Köppen Cfc) in the northern parts. On an annual basis, the southeast is both the wettest and warmest part of Alaska with milder temperatures in the winter and high precipitation throughout the year. This is also the only region in Alaska in which the average daytime high temperature is above freezing during the winter months.The climate of Anchorage and south central Alaska is mild by Alaskan standards due to the region's proximity to the seacoast. While the area gets less rain than southeast Alaska, it gets more snow, and days tend to be clearer. It is a subarctic climate (Köppen: Dfc) due to its brief, cool summers.

The climate of western Alaska is determined in large part by the Bering Sea and the Gulf of Alaska. It is a subarctic oceanic climate in the southwest and a continental subarctic climate farther north. The temperature is somewhat moderate considering how far north the area is. This region has a tremendous amount of variety in precipitation.

The climate of the interior of Alaska is subarctic. Some of the highest and lowest temperatures in Alaska occur around the area near Fairbanks. The summers may have temperatures reaching into the 90s °F (the low-to-mid 30s °C), while in the winter, the temperature can fall below . Precipitation is sparse in the Interior, often less than  a year, but what precipitation falls in the winter tends to stay the entire winter.

The highest and lowest recorded temperatures in Alaska are both in the Interior.

The climate in the extreme north of Alaska is Arctic (Köppen: ET) with long, very cold winters and short, cool summers.

Climate data

Land management
According to an October 1998 report by the United States Bureau of Land Management, approximately 65% of Alaska is owned and managed by the U.S. federal government as national forests, national parks, and national wildlife refuges. Of these, the Bureau of Land Management manages , or 23.8% of the state. The Arctic National Wildlife Refuge is managed by the United States Fish and Wildlife Service.

Of the remaining land area, the State of Alaska owns 24.5%; another 10% is managed by thirteen regional and dozens of local Native corporations created under the Alaska Native Claims Settlement Act. Various private interests own the remaining land, totaling less than 1%.

Alaska is administratively divided into "boroughs," as opposed to "counties." The function is the same, but whereas some states use a three-tiered system of decentralization — state/county/township — most of Alaska only uses two tiers — state/borough. Owing to the state's low population density, most of the land is located in the Unorganized Borough which, as the name implies, has no intermediate borough government of its own, but is administered directly by the state government. Currently (2000 census) 57.71 percent of Alaska's land area has this status; however, its population comprises only 13.05 percent of the state's total. For statistical purposes the United States Census Bureau divides this territory into census areas. Anchorage merged the city government with the Greater Anchorage Area Borough in 1971 to form the Municipality of Anchorage, containing the city proper, and the bedroom communities of Eagle River, Chugiak, Peters Creek, Girdwood, Bird Creek, and Indian. Fairbanks, on the other hand, has a separate borough (the Fairbanks North Star Borough) and municipality (the City of Fairbanks).

See also
Alaska census statistical areas
Alaska Peninsula
Bristol Bay
List of Alaska rivers
List of boroughs and census areas in Alaska
List of Ultras of Alaska
Mountain peaks of Alaska
List of areas disputed by Canada and the United States

References